Lucy De Ville were an Australian band from Melbourne.  Its lineup consisted of Shaun Gardener, Marcella Russo, and Marisa Warrington, all of whom appeared in the television soap opera Neighbours.

Band members
Marcella Russo is best known for her on-going performance as "Liljana Bishop" in Neighbours.  She is a well-known Adelaide performer who moved to Melbourne in 1995, working in both states in television, theatre, film, and radio and fronting many bands.  She played the character of Magenta in the hugely successful production of The Rocky Horror Show at The Regent Theatre in November 2004.

Shaun Gardener is the driving force behind the cover band "21-20". He fronted Channel 7's house band for Live and Kicking and has been a regular on Channel 10's GMA. He has written with many bands, most recently collaborating with Tim Rosewarne (ex Big Pig, Chocolate Starfish) on the Banana Boy project. As well as writing and performing with Lucy De Ville, he performs with several corporate bands and his music and voice can also be heard behind many television and radio campaigns.

Marisa Warrington is best known for her ongoing performance as "Sindi Watts" in Neighbours. She trained in the UK with the Royal Shakespeare Company and came home to perform with the Australian Shakespeare Company and the Melbourne Theatre Company. She has many television credits. A trained classical singer, Marisa also studied at the Victoria Ballet School, and put both talents to good use as Columbia in The Rocky Horror Show at The Regent Theatre in November 2004.

Music
Lucy De Ville - Lucy De Ville (2006)

1.   Love Story
2.   Running Back to You
3.   Diamonds
4.   Beautiful
5.   Who's Gonna Tell Her?
6.   Bury Me In Your Arms
7.   Trawling For You
8.   Better Than Nothing
9.   Daybreak 
10. Skylight
11. I'm Nothing

Looking For A Sign - Lucy De Ville

1. Looking for a Sign
2. Looking for a Sign (LFO Remix)
3. Running Back to You
4. Pillow Talk
5. Looking for a Sign (Acoustic)

External links
Official website (archived, 2005)
Neighbours: The Perfect Blend interview

Victoria (Australia) musical groups